Gunilla Birgitta Nyroos (born 7 October 1945) is a Swedish actress.

Life and career 
She won the award for Best Actress at the 20th Guldbagge Awards for her role in A Hill on the Dark Side of the Moon.

In the autumn 2008, she participated in Blommor av stål at Vasateatern in Stockholm, together with Pernilla August, Suzanne Reuter, Melinda Kinnaman, Cecilia Nilsson and Linda Ulvaeus.

Nyroos is married to Lennart Hjulström. Together they have a daughter Hanna Nyroos.

Filmography 
 2010 – Sissela och dödssynderna
 2007 – Nina Frisk (2007)
 1996 – Rusar i hans famn (1996)
 1992 – The Emperor of Portugallia (1992)
 1991 – The Best Intentions
 1989 – Tre kärlekar
 1987 – Nionde kompaniet (1987)
 1987 – Mio in the Land of Faraway (1987)
 1986 – Moa
 1983 – A Hill on the Dark Side of the Moon (1983)
 1977 – Jack
 1976 – Raskens
 1973 – Om 7 flickor
 1971 – Hem till byn

References

External links 

1945 births
Swedish actresses
Living people
Best Actress Guldbagge Award winners
Moa Award recipients